Felipe Borrego Estrada (born 11 November 1952) is a Mexican politician from the National Action Party. From 2006 to 2009 he served as Deputy of the LX Legislature of the Mexican Congress representing Zacatecas.

References

1952 births
Living people
Politicians from Zacatecas City
National Action Party (Mexico) politicians
21st-century Mexican politicians
Deputies of the LX Legislature of Mexico
Members of the Chamber of Deputies (Mexico) for Zacatecas